Sales ( or ) is a Portuguese-language surname of French roots (derived from Francis de Sales, a bishop and Catholic saint, member of the noble Sales family of the Duchy of Savoy), common in Portugal and Brazil (with an archaic alternative spelling, Salles).

This surname can be English, from Middle English  (sallows), a topographic name for someone who lived by a group of sallow trees.

Other variants are Spanish (Asturian-Leonese) and Catalan. The origins are habitational names from any of the places called Sales, like Sales de Llierca (Catalonia) or Sales (Asturies), from the plural of Sala.

Sales may refer to:

 Arlete Salles, Brazilian actress
 Arthur Sales (footballer, born 1900), (1900–1977) English footballer
 Arnaldo de Oliveira Sales, Hong Kong businessman and sports administrator
 Campos Sales (1841–1913), Brazilian politician and president
 Charles de Sales (1626–66), French soldier, governor of Saint Christophe
 David Sales (born 1977), English cricketer
 Edu Sales (born 1977), Brazilian footballer
 Eugênio de Araújo Sales (1920–2012), Brazilian cardinal 
 Fernando Sales (born 1977), Spanish footballer
 Francis de Sales (1567–1622), Catholic saint
 Francis De Sales (actor) (1912–1988), American actor
 Hayley Sales (born 1986), American singer-songwriter
 Hunt Sales (born 1954), American rock and roll drummer, brother of Tony Sales
 João Francisco de Sales (born 1986), Brazilian footballer
 Joshua Sales (born 1987), American musician
 Leigh Sales (born 1973), Australian journalist
 Liz Sales, American artist
 Luis Sales (1745–1807), Spanish missionary
 Luiz Fernando Corrêa Sales (born 1988), Brazilian footballer
 Nancy Jo Sales (born 1964), American journalist
 Nykesha Sales (born 1976), American basketball player
 Ruby Sales (born 1948), American social activist
 Scott Sales (born 1960), American politician
 Simone Sales (born 1988), Italian footballer
 Soupy Sales (1926–2009), American comedian
 Thiago Sales (born 1987), Brazilian footballer
 Thomas Sales (1868–1926), Canadian politician
 Tony Sales (born 1951), American rock musician, brother of Hunt Sales
 Wayne Sales (born 1949), Canadian businessman

See also
 Sale (surname)

References

Portuguese-language surnames
French-language surnames
English-language surnames
Spanish-language surnames
Catalan-language surnames